Ted Vogel (July 17, 1925 – September 27, 2019) was an American marathon runner who competed in the 1948 Summer Olympics.

References

1925 births
2019 deaths
American male marathon runners
Olympic track and field athletes of the United States
Athletes (track and field) at the 1948 Summer Olympics